U.S. National STEMI Receiving Centers are medical centers that specialize in receiving ST segment elevation myocardial infarction (STEMI) cases. These myocardial infarctions, or heart attacks, are due to fully blocked coronary arteries.

Since 2006, the American College of Cardiology and the American Heart Association have worked to implement a national designation of "STEMI Receiving Center" across the U.S, much like the certifications of trauma centers. Sameer Mehta is an interventional cardiologist who works with these organizations.

As of 2012 only a handful of hospitals had been designated. STEMI patients account for one-third or over 400,000 of all U.S. MI sufferers.

STEMI receiving hospitals
 Cedars-Sinai Medical Center
 ENLOE Medical Center
 Highland Hospital
 White Memorial Hospital
 Valley Presbyterian Hospital
 Rideout Memorial Hospital

References

Cardiology
Hospitals in the United States